William Henry Pilkington, Baron Pilkington (29 April 1905 – 23 December 1983) was an English glass manufacturer and president of the Federation of British Industries, who is remembered politically as chairman of the Pilkington Committee that produced the controversial Pilkington Report of 1962.  He was also Chancellor of Loughborough University from 1966 to 1980.

Early life and education
Pilkington was born in St Helens, Lancashire, the eldest son of Richard Austin Pilkington (1871-1951), JP, of Eccleston Grange, St Helens, a director of the family glass-manufacturing business, Pilkington Brothers Ltd, and his wife, Hope (1876-1947), daughter of the politician and judge Herbert Cozens-Hardy, 1st Baron Cozens-Hardy. His younger brother, Lawrence, would join him as a director of the family business; the third brother was the biologist and writer Roger Pilkington. The Pilkington family were Congregationalist. He was educated at Rugby School, a boarding independent school in the market town of Rugby in Warwickshire, followed by Magdalene College at the University of Cambridge.

Pilkington Brothers Ltd
Pilkington joined the board of the family business, Pilkington Brothers Ltd, in 1934 and served as chairman from 1949 to 1973. This glass manufacturing company became the lone survivor of twenty-four British glass manufacturers from the 19th century. While other companies died from competition, the Pilkington company advanced its techniques, especially in safety glass and glass sheets, using the company's proprietary float glass process. In 1967 the company controlled 85% of the glass-making business in the United Kingdom and exported its products to over 100 countries.

Pilkington Report

The Pilkington Report concluded that the British public were not being well-served by commercial television due to what it regarded as its American-influenced programming (such as westerns). It further concluded that although the British public had not been explicitly asked whether they wanted commercial radio, there was no evidence to support the contention that they wanted it. The unintended result of this conclusion was the creation of offshore commercial pirate radio in 1964. It also commended the BBC for the high quality of its television programming and recommended that the franchise for the-then third television channel should be granted to the BBC (which opened as BBC 2 in 1964), rather than to a commercial operator.

Personal life
In 1930, Pilkington married firstly, Rosamond Margaret, daughter of Royal Army Medical Corps Colonel Henry Davis Rowan, of Rathmore, Greystones, County Wicklow, Ireland. Rosamond died in 1953, having had with her husband a son and two daughters. He married secondly Mavis Joy Doreen, daughter of master reed-maker Gilbert Caffrey, of Woodleigh, Lostock Park, Bolton, and former wife of Dr John Hesketh Wilding.

Honours and arms

Knighted in 1953 New Years Honours List, Pilkington was created a Life Peer on 18 January 1968, in the 1968 New Years Honours List taking the title Baron Pilkington, of St Helens in the County Palatine of Lancashire. He was awarded the Honorary degree of Doctor of Science (D.Sc) by Loughborough University in 1966.

References

External links
National Portrait Gallery, London – Sir Harry sat for six portraits
Time (magazine) – Pilkington Shines Again: Pilkington Brothers Ltd., glass company. 15 December 1967
New Yorker magazine commenting upon the Pilkington Report, July 1962
Speech by Sir Harry to the Empire Club of Canada - 1 December 1955, Toronto, Canada

1905 births
1983 deaths
Alumni of Magdalene College, Cambridge
Chancellors of Loughborough University
Glass makers
People educated at Rugby School
Harry
Life peers
Knights Bachelor
Life peers created by Elizabeth II